St. Stanislaus Seminary is a former Society of Jesus (Jesuits) seminary that was founded in 1823 on the outskirts of Florissant, Missouri within the current municipal limits of Hazelwood, Missouri. It was the longest continuously operated Jesuit novitiate in the United States.

History

Working life
The seminary was founded in 1823 as some log buildings and a large farm worked by enslaved people to support the missionaries.  They had come to Florissant from Maryland at the behest of Louis William Valentine DuBourg. It was named for Stanislaus Kostka. The main building, now known as the Old Rock Building, was built from 1840 to 1849 from limestone quarried by the Jesuits and people they enslaved.  Pierre-Jean De Smet was based in St. Stanislaus Seminary for some years. Some known early students are: Peter Joseph Arnoudt. and Adrian Hoecken.

The seminary was closed in 1971 due to fewer religious vocations and the post-Vatican II movement to urban areas. Two years earlier, it had already transferred its collegiate program to Saint Louis University. Most of what was left of the property, was sold to The Missouri District of The United Pentecostal Church International, and then the property housed Urshan College (formerly Gateway College of Evangelism)  and Urshan Graduate School of Theology. Now the building is used for Gateway Legacy Christian Academy.

Museum
In 1973, the seminary became the Museum of the Western Jesuit Missions, but closed again in 2001, the museum moving to Saint Louis University to become part of the Museum of Art there.

The property
The property was largely self-sufficient in its day. The still-standing Rock Building was built by Jesuits and people they enslaved. The wooden parts came from walnut, logged from the property by the Jesuits, and the bricks were also made on site. The seminary fed itself with an orchard, a chicken ranch, a cattle barn, wheat fields, vineyards, a butcher shop, a creamery, and a bakery. The former farm property is now owned by Saint Louis County, which leases it to the Missouri Department of Conservation as a conservation area.

References

Jesuit universities and colleges
Buildings and structures in St. Louis County, Missouri
Properties of religious function on the National Register of Historic Places in Missouri
Greek Revival architecture in Missouri
National Register of Historic Places in St. Louis County, Missouri
School buildings completed in 1840
1823 establishments in Missouri
1971 disestablishments in Missouri
Slave cabins and quarters in the United States
Plantation houses in the United States